Gudmund Stenersen (18 August 1863 – 17 August 1934) was a Norwegian painter and illustrator.

Biography
He was born in Ringsaker as a son of veterinarian Stener Johannes Stenersen (1835–1904) and Helga Hermana Heltberg (1842–1921). He was a grandnephew of theologian Stener Johannes Stenersen, Sr. (1789–1835). He took his examen artium in Hamar in 1883, and then took education and work as a dentist while painting on his spare time. His first work to be accepted at the Autumn Exhibit was I Baadstøe in 1885. 

After working as a dentist in Tønsberg from 1886 to 1889, he studied in Paris under Léon Bonnat and Fernand Cormon from 1889 to 1892. Time from 1893 to 1894 was spent in Italy. He then moved to Stavanger. There, in January 1897, he married photographer's daughter Karen Wally Jacobsen (1874–1962). In 1898 they moved to Christiania. He became a father-in-law of Carl Semb, who married Stenersen's daughter Helga Louise Stenersen in February 1926.

He mainly painted in the naturalist style, with portraits of Christiania as well as Odal, Gudbrandsdalen, Vestfold and Valdres. He also portrayed many notable people of the day. He was also a notable illustrator, among others in the books Vestlandsviser (by Vilhelm Krag, 1898), Fra fjeld og fremmed Land (by Theodor Caspari, 1900), Smaafæ (by Hans Aanrud, 1906 as well as his own release Besøg i skogen (1905). 

He made illustrations in Aftenposten in 1917, and also made Christmas magazines. Notable paintings include Fra Siena (1893) and Njosgardene i Valdres (1893–1902), which are owned by the National Museum of Art, Architecture and Design.

Stenersen chaired Tegneforbundet from 1901 to 1926, and was a freemason. He died in August 1934 in Oslo.

References

1863 births
1934 deaths
People from Ringsaker
20th-century Norwegian painters
21st-century Norwegian painters
Norwegian illustrators
Norwegian dentists
Norwegian expatriates in France
Norwegian expatriates in Italy
Norwegian Freemasons